Uda is an Indian village located in Darbhanga District of Bihar State.

References

India